"Phantom Minds" is the 21st single by Japanese singer and voice actress Nana Mizuki, released on January 13, 2010, by King Records. The single debuted at number one on Oricon weekly charts, becoming the first voice actress single to top the charts. It is also her current highest selling single.

Track listing 
 "Phantom Minds"
Lyrics: Nana Mizuki
Composition: Eriko Yoshiki
Arrangement: Jun Suyama
Opening theme for anime film Magical Girl Lyrical Nanoha The Movie 1st
 "Don't be long"
Lyrics: Toshirō Yabuki
Composition: Toshirō Yabuki
Arrangement: Toshirō Yabuki
Insert song for anime film Magical Girl Lyrical Nanoha The Movie 1st
 "Song Communication"
Lyrics: Yūmao
Composition: Hitoshi Fujima (Elements Garden)
Arrangement: Hitoshi Fujima (Elements Garden)
 
Lyrics: Chiyomaru Shikura
Composition: Chiyomaru Shikura
Arrangement: Daisuke Kikuta (Elements Graden)
Theme song for arcade game Shining Force Cross

Charts

Oricon Sales Chart (Japan)

References

2010 singles
Nana Mizuki songs
Oricon Weekly number-one singles
Songs written by Nana Mizuki
Japanese film songs
Songs written for animated films
2010 songs
King Records (Japan) singles